Yazdgerd (also Romanized as Yazdejerd, Yazdegerd, and Yazjerd) is a village in Silakhor Rural District, Silakhor District, Dorud County, Lorestan Province, Iran. At the 2006 census, its population was 62, in 16 families.

References 

Towns and villages in Dorud County